A Bjerrum plot (named after Niels Bjerrum; sometimes also known as a Sillén diagram or a Hägg diagram) is a graph of the concentrations of the different species of a polyprotic acid in a solution, as a function of pH, when the solution is at equilibrium. Due to the many orders of magnitude spanned by the concentrations, they are commonly plotted on a logarithmic scale. Sometimes the ratios of the concentrations are plotted rather than the actual concentrations. Occasionally H+ and OH− are also plotted.

Most often, the carbonate system is plotted, where the polyprotic acid is carbonic acid (a diprotic acid), and the different species are dissolved carbon dioxide, carbonic acid, bicarbonate, and carbonate. At every pH, the concentration of carbonic acid is assumed to be negligible compared to the concentration of dissolved , and so is often omitted from Bjerrum plots. These plots are very helpful in solution chemistry and natural water chemistry. In the example given here, it illustrates the response of seawater pH and carbonate speciation due to the input of man-made  emission by the fossil fuel combustion.

The Bjerrum plots for other polyprotic acids, including silicic, boric, sulfuric and phosphoric acids, are other commonly used examples.

Bjerrum plot equations for carbonate system

If carbon dioxide, carbonic acid, hydrogen ions, bicarbonate and carbonate are all dissolved in water, and at chemical equilibrium, their equilibrium concentrations are often assumed to be given by:

 

where the subscript 'eq' denotes that these are equilibrium concentrations, K1 is the equilibrium constant for the reaction  +   H+ +  (i.e. the first acid dissociation constant for carbonic acid), K2 is the equilibrium constant for the reaction   H+ +  (i.e. the second acid dissociation constant for carbonic acid), and DIC is the (unchanging) total concentration of dissolved inorganic carbon in the system, i.e. [] + [] + []. K1, K2 and DIC each have units of a concentration, e.g. mol/L.

A Bjerrum plot is obtained by using these three equations to plot these three species against , for given K1, K2 and DIC. The fractions in these equations give the three species' relative proportions, and so if DIC is unknown, or the actual concentrations are unimportant, these proportions may be plotted instead.

Therefore, the values of K1 and K2 that were used to create a given Bjerrum plot can easily be found from that plot, by reading off the concentrations at these points of intersection. An example with linear Y axis is shown in the accompanying graph. The values of K1 and K2, and therefore the curves in the Bjerrum plot, vary substantially with temperature and salinity.

Chemical and mathematical derivation of Bjerrum plot equations for carbonate system
Suppose that the reactions between carbon dioxide, hydrogen ions, bicarbonate and carbonate ions, all dissolved in water, are as follows:

Note that reaction  is actually the combination of two elementary reactions:
  +     H+ + 

Assuming the mass action law applies to these two reactions, that water is abundant, and that the different chemical species are always well-mixed, their rate equations are
 

where  denotes concentration, t is time, and K1 and k−1 are appropriate proportionality constants for reaction , called respectively the forwards and reverse rate constants for this reaction. (Similarly K2 and k−2 for reaction .)

At any equilibrium, the concentrations are unchanging, hence the left hand sides of these equations are zero. Then, from the first of these four equations, the ratio of reaction 's rate constants equals the ratio of its equilibrium concentrations, and this ratio, called K1, is called the equilibrium constant for reaction , i.e.

where the subscript 'eq' denotes that these are equilibrium concentrations.

Similarly, from the fourth equation for the equilibrium constant K2 for reaction ,

Rearranging  gives

 

Re-arranging this gives the equation for :
 

See also 
 Charlot equation
 Gran plot (also known as Gran titration or the Gran method)
 Henderson–Hasselbalch equation
 Hill equation (biochemistry)
 Ion speciation
 Fresh water
 Seawater
 Thermohaline circulation

References 

Acid–base chemistry
Aquatic ecology
Chemical oceanography
Geochemistry
Limnology
Oceanography
Soil chemistry
Thermodynamics
Water chemistry